Novica Milenović (Serbian Cyrillic: Новица Миленовић; born 14 January 1989 in Belgrade) is a Serbian football player currently playing in Serbian First League club Voždovac, and also a member of the Serbia national under-19 football team.

External sources
 Profile at Srbijafudbal.
 Novica Milenović Stats at Utakmica.rs

Living people
1989 births
Footballers from Belgrade
Serbian footballers
OFK Beograd players
FK Spartak Subotica players
FK Voždovac players
Serbian SuperLiga players
Association football defenders